Tisamenus clotho is a stick insect species native to the Philippines.

Taxonomy 
James Abram Garfield Rehn and his son John William Holman Rehn described the species in 1939 under the basionym Hoploclonia clotho. An adult female collected by Taylor on Polillo Island from the collection of Morgan Hebard at the Academy of Natural Sciences of Drexel University in Philadelphia was chosen as holotype. From the collection of the United States National Museum, a juvenile male has been  chosen as allotype and an adult female as another paratype. In addition, Rehn and Rehn examined three other juvenile females from this collection and one juvenile male from the Hebard collection for their description. All specimens examined were from Polillo. They divided the Philippine species of the genus into different groups according to morphological features. Hoploclonia clotho was placed with Hoploclonia serratoria (today Tisamenus serratorius), Hoploclonia asper (today Tisamenus asper),  Hoploclonia atropis (today Tisamenus atropis) in the so-called Serratoria group. Their species are relatively spiny, have distinct lateral spines along the margins of the meso- and metathorax and an isosceles triangle on the anterior mesothorax, reaching about halfway down the mesonotum. Since Oliver Zompro transferred the Philippine species of Hoploclonia to the genus Tisamenus in 2004 and left only those occurring on Borneo in the genus Hoploclonia, the species is named Tisamenus clotho.

In a molecular genetics study published in 2021, representatives of other Tisamenus species were included in addition to Tisamenus clotho from Camarines Norte. It turned out that the species is not so closely related to Tisamenus serratorius,  as Rehn and Rehn had suspected in their 1939 group classification. It is more closely related to Tisamenus deplanatus and two undescribed or unidentified species from Camiguin and Sibuyan.

Description 
Females of Tisamenus clotho are light brown to buckthorn brown and often show other shades of brown, with the head and legs being darker. Males are significantly smaller and dark brown. The head is almost square and only slightly longer than wide. The supraorbitals are formed as three prominent, elongated tubercles. The occipitals and median coronals are present as flat tubercles, the lateral coronals are bifid, rounded tubercles. As with Tisamenus deplanatus, the triangular region typical of the genus on the mesonotum is relatively short, reaching just under the middle of the mesothorax, where it forms an approximately equilateral triangle forms. From the center of the base of the triangle at the anterior edge of the mesonotum, a faintly indicated carina runs across the triangle to its posterior angle. From there it extends as a prominent longitudinal carina further over the rest of the mesonotum and the entire metanotum. The mesopleura are armed with four lateral spines, the metapleura with two lateral spines. Behind are the supracoxals, which are also spiny and whose supracoxal angle is shaped into a short tubercle.

Distribution 
The type material of the species comes from Polillo Island. The animals being bred were collected in two localities in the province of Camarines Norte in southern Luzon. These are located at Mount Bagacay in the Barangay Fundado of Labo and at Mananap falls in the Barangay Fabrica of Daet.

In captivity 
A stock keeping by enthusiasts in terrariums derives from specimens from Camarines Norte collected by Thierry Heitzmann on July 22 at Mount Bagacay and August 4, 2015 at Mananap falls. Their species affiliation was not certain at first, so they were named Tisamenus cf. clotho 'Camarines'. Joachim Bresseel identified these as Tisamenus clotho. The species is easy to keep and breed. They eat leaves of bramble, other Rosaceae and hazel.

References

External links

Phasmatodea
Phasmatodea of Asia
Insects described in 1939